Mary J.L. Gleason is a Canadian judge. Gleason was appointed as a justice of the Federal Court of Appeal in 2015. Prior to her appointment she was a senior partner with Norton Rose in Ottawa, Ontario.

References

Judges of the Federal Court of Appeal (Canada)
Canadian women judges
Living people
Year of birth missing (living people)